Abasallı (also, Abbasally and Abas-Ali) is a village in the Neftchala Rayon of Azerbaijan. The village forms part of the municipality of Tatarməhlə.

References

External links
Satellite map at Maplandia.com

Populated places in Neftchala District